Wag Kang Lilingon! (English: Don't Turn Away!; more specifically Don't Look Back!) is a 2006 Filipino reality Supernatural horror-action-thriller film directed by Jerry Lopez Sineneng and Quark Henares and starring Anne Curtis and Kristine Hermosa. It was the first film co-produced by Viva Films and Star Cinema years after Viva ended its ties with ABS-CBN in 2001.

Plot

The plot is separated into three parts: Uyayi, Salamin, and the film's epilogue.

Uyayi (Lullaby)

The Angel of Mercy Hospital is cursed by unknown spirits, most of them male patients. A nurse named Melissa (Anne Curtis) is haunted by these spirits and seeks help from her boyfriend, James (Marvin Agustin). Both Melissa and James conclude that someone from the hospital murdered these patients, and Melissa suspects that Dr. Carl (Raymond Bagatsing), one of the head doctors, is the killer. James offers to spy around the hospital, pretending to be a sick patient.

One night, another patient is killed, with some doctors speculating that he died during sleep paralysis. During the investigation, one of the nurses Melissa works with recognizes James as a former patient. Melissa is shocked and searches the hospital's files for James' documents. It is revealed that James was a former patient of the hospital who was taken in for psychosis after his girlfriend died due to a botched abortion. Melissa confronts James and begins distancing herself from him.

Melissa's sanity begins to decline after she finds Dr. Carl dead in his car at the hospital parking. She begins to panic and run away as a series of apparitions manifest around her. She eventually bumps into James', who comforts her.

At 3AM the next morning, the hauntings worsen. Melissa enters an elevator that begins to shake and the lights turn on and off. The elevator stops on a floor and opens to show James murdered and hanging from the ceiling. She becomes scared, gets off on the next floor, and calls James to meet her as she feels that his life is in danger. James meets up with Melissa, calming her down and formulating their next move. Melissa leads James to a room where she says he'll be safe.

Melissa soon begins an argument with James, saying that he doesn't believe her and that he thinks she's crazy. She turns her back from James and starts humming a lullaby. Worried, James asks her if she's okay. Melissa turns to James, asking him if he loves her, then tells him that if he loves her, he shouldn't look back. As James begins to look behind him, Melissa pushes him to a shelf full of chemicals, severely burning half of his face. Melissa then stabs him to death with a scalpel, revealing her to be the killer.

Salamin (Mirror)

Rosing (Cherry Pie Picache), along with her daughters, Angel (Kristine Hermosa) and Nina (Celine Lim), begin a new life at their new home. The house is old and has been uninhabited for years. The caretaker, Nestor (Soliman Cruz), tells them the electricity doesn't work, while Rosing detects the smell of blood. Angel dismisses her mother, suggesting that it's just her sickness. The girls explore the rest of the house, with Nina trying to open a door leading to the basement, but to no avail.

That night, while making dinner, the door leading to the basement suddenly opens. The family goes down the basement and see an antique-looking mirror. Angel then tells Nina of a superstition: during a full moon, you light a candle in front of a mirror and, if you wish hard enough, you will see your future husband. Rosing objects to the idea, saying that it's dangerous and that they shouldn't be messing with stuff in the basement. The girls don't listen and they do the ritual. Nina becomes disappointed when nothing happens. The next day, strange things begin to happen, such as dead cats collecting outside their front door and apparitions suddenly appearing. Angel asks Nestor if anyone has died in the house, but Nestor replies that nobody died there.

The hauntings worsen and a frantic Angel seeks help from her psychic friend, Trixie (Dimples Romana). Trixie reveals that the mirror became a portal that opened after doing their ritual and that the spirits from the mirror were souls of the previous tenants of the house. Trixie suggests that they get rid of the mirror, with her and Angel dumping it in a river. Rosing decides to have the house blessed afterwards. Later on, Angel finds out that a former tenant, a woman, was murdered in the house. As she goes to visit the woman's grave, Angel sees Nestor and confronts him about lying to her about the house. Nestor rebuffs her, saying that all houses have ghosts. When Angel asks whether the killer was caught, Nestor reveals that he has been suspected, but was cleared of the charge.

One morning, another haunting incident occur and the family decide to leave the house for good. While departing, Angel sees the mirror that she and Trixie dumped in the river, and foresaw the death of her family. Rosing asks Angel what she was doing, but as Angel begins to explain and point at the mirror, the mirror was gone. The family goes to Trixie and asks if they can stay with her for a few days, to which she happily obliged. That night, the spirits have followed them and begins to haunt them relentlessly. After the haunting stopped, Angel decides to go back to the house to figure out a way to stop the spirits.

Angel arrives at the house, goes to the basement, and is shocked to see Nestor there. Angel figures out that Nestor was the killer. Nestor begins to chase Angel around the house, with Trixie, Rosing, and Nina arriving to come to Angel's aid. Ghosts of the previous tenants of the house also appear throughout the chase with Nestor, with the ghosts witnessing the chase and the deaths of the characters (including the house's caretaker Nestor himself where his death that ended the chase is being witnessed by a white lady). Trixie is bludgeoned on the head by Nestor and corners Angel, Rosing, and Nina. Rosing and Angel are stabbed, while Nina runs away and goes to the basement. Nestor chases after her and Nina becomes trapped in the basement. Cornered, Nestor hums a lullaby (the same lullaby Melissa hums in Uyayi), telling Nina to come out. A bleeding Angel then hits Nestor on the head, bludgeoned him on a mirror (the same mirror that Angel and Nina did a candle-lighting ritual, and Trixie and Angel dumped in the river earlier in the segment), killing him. Angel then dies in Nina's arms.

Epilogue
In a series of flashbacks, it is revealed that Nina became an orphan after the events of Salamin. She is placed in an orphanage and she changes her name to Melissa. She leaves for the United States, where she studied nursing and worked there for the next 6 years, only to return to the Philippines to work at the Angel of Mercy hospital. It is then revealed that her childhood home was demolished and the hospital was erected in its place. The spirits that haunts the Angel of Mercy hospital are the same ghosts that haunted Melissa's old house.

Melissa is then seen driving James' body to Angel's dream house. During dinner, Melissa is seen talking to Angel, Rosing, and James, who is alive and well. A sad Angel then tells Melissa that she can't keep them in the mortal world and that she must let them go. As the camera zooms out, it is shown that Melissa is alone, with James' body on a dining chair, talking to herself and carrying the entire conversation.

The movie ends with Melissa hearing James whisper her name, leaning closer towards him. Suddenly, James awakens from his unconscious state and grabs her by the neck as she screams and the screen cuts to black.

Cast and characters

Uyayi (Lullaby)
Anne Curtis as Melissa/Nina
Marvin Agustin as James
Raymond Bagatsing as Dr. Carl

Salamin (Mirror)
Kristine Hermosa as Angel
Cherry Pie Picache as Rosing
Celine Lim as Nina
Soliman Cruz as Mang Nestor
Dimples Romana as Trixie
Baron Geisler as Red
Archie Alemania as Lander
Julia Clarete as Maila

See also
 List of ghost films

External links

Star Cinema films
Viva Films films
2006 horror films
2006 films
Philippine horror films
Filipino-language films
Films directed by Jerry Lopez Sineneng